The Kawasaki KZ750B twin is a twin-cylinder, touring motorcycle announced in 1975 and manufactured from 1976 to 1979. It was based on the smaller Kawasaki KZ400 introduced in 1975. 

The air cooled engine shared similar engine design with the KZ400 having chain-driven twin dynamic balancer shafts. The valve seats were hardened to allow use of low-grade fuel.

The machine was engineered to have a wide power band and smooth torque curve.

References

Z750 twin
Motorcycles introduced in 1976